The Palazzo dell'Arengario is a  Fascist-era complex of two symmetrical buildings in Piazza del Duomo, the central piazza of Milan, Italy. It was completed in the 1950s and currently houses the Museo del Novecento, a museum dedicated to 20th-century art. The word "arengario" refers to its original function as a local government seat in the Fascist period.

History
The Arengario was designed by Piero Portaluppi, Giovanni Muzio, Pier Giulio Magistretti and Enrico Agostino Griffini. The palaces were meant to be connected by an arch to insinuate symmetry with the Galleria Vittorio Emanuele II entrance across the Piazza. Construction began in 1936, but experienced several delays and suffered from the World War II bombings; it was eventually completed in 1956. The façades on the eastern wing are decorated with 4 reliefs by Arturo Martini. The crowded panels depict historical events and persons linked to Christianity, Milan, and Lombardy: including the dream of Constantine (easternmost panel, facing Duomo); Ambrose on horseback enters Milan take his bishopric against the wishes of the Arians (inner panel, eastern wing, facing Duomo); the busy Battle of Legnano (northernmost panel facing western wing); four Sforza dukes of Milan (middle panel facing western wing); and Carlo Borromeo ministering to those afflicted by the plague (southernmost panel facing west wing). The 4 main portals are decorated by Giacomo Manzù.

In the 2000s, the palace was restored and adapted by Italo Rota and Fabio Fornasari to house the Museo del Novecento, a museum of twentieth-century art inaugurated in 2010, especially renowned for its unique collection of Futurist paintings. During the restoration works, a "media façade" (i.e., a 487 m2 LED screen displaying news on upcoming events, advertising, and more) was affixed to the façade of the left-hand building.

References

Government buildings completed in 1956
Houses completed in 1956
Arengario
Tourist attractions in Milan
Italian fascist architecture